Jerrod Terrel Johnson (born July 27, 1988) is a former American football quarterback and current coach who is the quarterbacks coach with the Houston Texans of the National Football League (NFL). After previously working for the Vikings in an assistant role. He was signed by the Philadelphia Eagles as an undrafted free agent in 2011. He played college football at Texas A&M. Johnson was Texas A&M's starting quarterback from 2008 to 2010, finishing his collegiate career ranked first in school history with 8,011 passing yards and 8,888 yards total offense. He is currently second in school history in passing yards (behind Kellen Mond) and third in total offense (behind Johnny Manziel and Kellen Mond).

College career

2006 season 
Johnson saw no action during the 2006 football season as he was redshirted.

He was also on the Aggie basketball team for a while during the 2006–07 basketball season, playing minor minutes under coach Billy Gillispie in three games against Big 12 opponents, recording just a single assist and no points or rebounds. He chose to focus on football after the season.

2007 season 

During the 2007 football season Johnson backed up junior Stephen McGee at quarterback. He took 20 snaps the entire season, and 13 of those 20 were running plays. He compiled 161 all-purpose yards for five touchdowns.

2008 season

Prior to Johnson's sophomore season, head coach Mike Sherman became the Aggies' new coach. During fall camp Johnson competed for the starting job with senior Stephen McGee, but lost out to the veteran team leader. Johnson was then moved to part-time receiver. He made his first catch vs Arkansas State for a gain of 36 yards. His role as a wide receiver continued for only a brief period. In the second game of the season, vs New Mexico, Stephen McGee suffered a right shoulder sprain on the opening series. Johnson stepped in and completed 10-of-19 for 124 yards and 3 touchdowns. He returned to the wide receiver position against Army, but McGee re-injured his shoulder during the game, paving the way for Johnson to step in and lead Texas A&M to a victory. Against Kansas State, Johnson compiled 419 passing yards and 487 total offensive yards, setting then-single game school records in both categories. He threw for 381 yards and a career-best four touchdown passes against Iowa State. Johnson threw for a career-high of 4 interceptions against Baylor.

2009 season

Johnson and Ryan Tannehill battled for the starting position during the 2009 offseason, but Johnson eventually prevailed. Johnson led the team to a 6–6 regular-season record including an upset road win at Texas Tech. He compiled a school-record 3,217 passing yards in the regular season, and also led the Big 12 in touchdown passes for the season. In the 2009 Independence Bowl against Georgia, he completed 29 of 58 passes for 362 yards and two touchdowns, but was sacked three times and intercepted twice in the loss.  He was named Second-team All-Big 12 for his performance during the 2009 regular season.

2010 season

In the spring prior to his 2010 season, Johnson had arthroscopic shoulder surgery.

He entered the 2010 season as the Preseason Big 12 Offensive Player of the Year and a dark horse Heisman Trophy candidate. However, he failed to meet the high expectations. He threw nine interceptions in the first five games of the season, and then struggled in the 30–9 loss to Missouri. A sports editor noted that Johnson struggled with his accuracy and seemed to have less of a "zip" on his passes. During the ensuing Kansas game, he split time at quarterback with second-string Ryan Tannehill. Tannehill outperformed Johnson with his 12-for-16 passes for 155 yards and three touchdowns. Johnson lost the starting job to Tannehill after the Kansas game.

Over the first seven games, Johnson posted 158-of-279 passes for 14 touchdowns and nine interceptions. His passing efficiency rating was 125.4. He was also sacked 25 times on 304 plays. However, during the Kansas game, he raised his total career yardage to 8,888, breaking the school record of 8,876 held by Reggie McNeal from 2002–05. He is the A&M career leader in both total offense (8,888 yards) and passing yards (8,011 yards).

Johnson continued to stay on the sidelines for the remainder of the season. Despite losing the starting position, Johnson was noted for his humility.

College statistics

Professional career
Johnson played in the 2011 East–West Shrine Game. A sports editor commented that Johnson had the least zip of all the quarterbacks who played, and did not throw like he used to during the 2009 season.

He went undrafted in the 2011 NFL Draft.

Hartford Colonials
Johnson was selected first overall in the 2011 UFL Draft by the Hartford Colonials. However, the Colonials went out of business and Johnson was a free agent.

Philadelphia Eagles
He signed as an undrafted free agent with the Philadelphia Eagles on July 26, 2011. He was waived on August 13.

Arizona Rattlers
He was assigned to the Arizona Rattlers on September 27, 2011.

Pittsburgh Steelers
The Pittsburgh Steelers signed Johnson on January 13, 2012.  They then cut him on August 31, 2012.

Sacramento Mountain Lions
Johnson signed with the Sacramento Mountain Lions in September 2012, serving as the team's backup quarterback. He became the team's starter in Week 2 of the 2012 season after an injury to starter Josh Johnson.

Seattle Seahawks
The Seattle Seahawks signed Johnson on April 24, 2013. He was released on June 14, after the Seahawks signed Tarvaris Jackson who had just been released by the Buffalo Bills.

Chicago Bears
On September 1, 2013, Johnson was signed by the Chicago Bears to the practice squad. He was released on September 4, 2013, and was brought back on September 9. He was again removed from the practice squad on September 24.

Johnson was re-signed by the Bears on December 30, 2013.

Baltimore Ravens
Johnson was signed by the Baltimore Ravens . On August 29, 2016, he was waived by the Ravens.

Dallas Cowboys
Johnson was signed by the Dallas Cowboys on September 1, 2016. On September 3, 2016, he was released by the Cowboys.

Coaching career
Johnson joined the San Francisco 49ers under the Bill Walsh Diversity Coaching Fellowship in 2017, and had a similar position with the Indianapolis Colts in 2019. He was promoted to offensive quality control coach with the Colts on February 17, 2020. Johnson got a job with the Minnesota Vikings under Kevin O'Connell as the new assistant Quarterbacks coach. Johnson was hired as the Quarterbacks coach for the Houston Texans on February 12, 2023 by new head coach DeMeco Ryans, who Johnson had previously worked with in San Francisco.

Personal life
Jerrod has one brother named Marquis. Their father, Larry Johnson, who also played for the Aggies, died of a stroke in December 2007. Jerrod married his wife Braidee Ireland in May 2021.

References

External links
 Montreal Alouettes profile 
 Texas A&M profile

1988 births
Living people
American football quarterbacks
American men's basketball players
Arizona Rattlers players
Baltimore Ravens players
Dallas Cowboys players
Hartford Colonials players
Philadelphia Eagles players
Pittsburgh Steelers players
Sacramento Mountain Lions players
Seattle Seahawks players
Texas A&M Aggies football players
Texas A&M Aggies men's basketball players
Sportspeople from Houston
Players of American football from Houston
Basketball players from Houston
San Francisco 49ers coaches
Indianapolis Colts coaches
Minnesota Vikings coaches